Anilios longissimus, also known as the extremely long blind snake, is a species of blind snake that is endemic to Australia. The specific epithet longissimus (“extremely long”) refers to the snake's size and appearance.

Description
The snake grows to an average of about 27 cm in length. The body is unpigmented and appears almost translucent.

Behaviour
The species is oviparous.

Distribution and habitat
The species is known only from Barrow Island, some 50 km off the Pilbara coast of north-western Western Australia. The snake's habitat is subterranean, with the holotype specimen recovered from a well-casing raised from a considerable depth during drilling operations. The type locality on the island is Bandicoot Bay.

References

 
longissimus
Snakes of Australia
Reptiles of Western Australia
Reptiles described in 1998